The Connellsville Coalfield is located in Fayette County and Westmoreland County, Pennsylvania, between the city of Latrobe and the small borough of Smithfield, and is sometimes known as the Connellsville Coke Field.  This is because the section of the Pittsburgh coal seam here was famous as one of the finest metallurgical coals in the world.  It is locally known as the Connellsville coal seam, but is actually a portion of the Pittsburgh seam.  

Coal was mined in this field from the early 19th century.  Actual coking of the coal was first tried near Connellsville in the 1840s.  After the Civil War a beehive coke industry gained a foothold in the region.  The heyday of the Connellsville Coalfield was from the 1880s to the 1920s.  At least 60 coal towns, known as "coal patches", were constructed in the field.  H.C. Frick Coal and Coke - a subsidiary of U.S. Steel after 1903 - was the major player.  Other notable industrialists included Josiah Van Kirk Thompson, W. J. Rainey, and Philip Cochran.  

In an event known as the Morewood massacre in the early morning of April 2, 1891, local law enforcement shot into a crowd of striking United Mine Workers miners from the Morewood Coke Works, near Mount Pleasant, Pennsylvania.  Seven miners died on the scene, and three more later died from their injuries.  

The coalfield endured the long decline in the beehive coke industry and a gradual exhaustion of the coal reserves. Mining activity is minimal now, and only relegated to the occasional strip mine.

List of Coal Patches in the Connellsville Field.

 Acme
 Alice 
 Atlantic 
 Baggely 
 Bessemer 
 Bitner
 Bradenville 
 Broadford
 Brinkertown 
 Brownfield 
 Bute
 Calumet 
 Carpentertown 
 Central 
 Collier 
 Continental #1 
 Davidson 
 Donnelley 
 Dorothy 
 Eagle 
 Elk Grove  
 Fairchance 
 Ferguson 
 Foxtown
 Hecla (Southwest) 
 Hill Farm 
 Hostetter 
 Humpreys 
 Junianta 
 Leisenring 
 Leith 
 Lemont Furnace 
 Mahoning 
 Mahoney
 Mammoth 
 Marguerite 
 Mayfield 
 McClure 
 Monarch
 Monastery
 Morewood
 Mt Braddock
 Mutual 
 Nellie
 Newcomer
 Oliphant 
 Oliver #1 
 Oliver #2 
 Oliver #3 
 Outcrop 
 Owensdale (Summit)
 Pennsville
 Pleasant Unity (Jamison #20)
 Red Shaft
 Revere
 Saint Vincent Shaft
 Shoaf
 Sitka
 Standard 
 Standard Shaft
 Summit (Owensdale)
 Superior
 Trauger
 Trotter
 Uledi
 United
 Valley Works 
 West Latrobe
 West Leisenring
 Wheeler
 Whitney
 Wynn
 York Run 
 Youngstown

See also
Coalfield
Connellsville, Pennsylvania

References

External links 
Coalfields of the Appalachian Mountains - Connellsville Field

Mining in Pennsylvania
Coal mining in Appalachia
Coal mining regions in the United States
Coal towns in Pennsylvania
Geography of Fayette County, Pennsylvania
Geography of Westmoreland County, Pennsylvania